was a  after Manji and before Enpō. This period spanned the years from April 1661 to September 1673.

Change of era
 1661 : The new era name of Kanbun (meaning "Generous Art") was created to mark a number of disasters, including a great fire at the Imperial Palace. The previous era ended and a new one commenced in Manji 4.

Events of the Kanbun era
 March 20, 1662 (Kanbun 2, 1st day of the 2nd month): There was a violent earthquake in Heian-kyō which destroyed the tomb of Toyotomi Hideyoshi .
 1662 (Kanbun 2): Emperor Gosai ordered Tosa Hiromichi (土佐広通, 1599–1670), a Tosa-school disciple, to adopt the name Sumiyoshi (probably in reference to a 13th-century painter, Sumiyoshi Keinin 住吉慶忍), upon assuming a position as official painter for the Sumiyoshi Taisha 住吉大社.
 March 5, 1663 (Kanbun 3, 26th day of the 1st month):  Go-sai abdicated in favor of his younger brother, Satohito, aged 10; and then he lived in complete retirement until his death.
 June 6, 1663 (Kanbun 3, 1st day of the 5th month): An earthquake struck in Ōmi Province.
 1665 (Kanbun 5, 6th month): Courts of inquiry were established in all the villages of the empire. These courts were charged with discovering the faith of the inhabitants, and their express purpose was to discover and eradicate all remnants of Christianity and Christian believers in Japan.
 1668 (Kanbun 8, 1st day of the 2nd month): A major fire broke out in Edo—a conflagration lasting 45 days. The disastrous fire was attributed to arson. Residents of Edo and later historians of the period also called this the fire of the eighth year of Kanbun.
 1669 (Kanbun 9): An Ainu rebellion, Shakushain's Revolt (1669–1672), breaks out in Hokkaido against the Matsumae clan
 1670 (Kanbun 10): The Bonin Islands (Ogasawara Islands) are discovered by the Japanese when a ship bound for Edo from Kyūshū is blown off course by a storm.

Notes

References
 Nussbaum, Louis Frédéric and Käthe Roth. (2005). Japan Encyclopedia. Cambridge: Harvard University Press. ; OCLC 48943301
 Ponsonby-Fane, Richard Arthur Brabazon. (1959).  The Imperial House of Japan. Kyoto: Ponsonby Memorial Society. OCLC 194887
 Screech, Timon. (2006). Secret Memoirs of the Shoguns: Isaac Titsingh and Japan, 1779–1822. London: RoutledgeCurzon. ; OCLC 65177072
 Tanaka, Hiroyuki. (1993). "The Ogasawara Islands in Tokugawa Japan",  Kaiji Shi Kenkyuu (Journal of the Maritime History). No. 50, June, 1993, Tokyo: The Japan Society of the History of Maritime.... Click link to digitized, full-text copy of this monograph (in English)
 Titsingh, Isaac. (1834). Nihon Ōdai Ichiran; ou,  Annales des empereurs du Japon.  Paris: Royal Asiatic Society, Oriental Translation Fund of Great Britain and Ireland. OCLC 5850691.

External links
 National Diet Library, "The Japanese Calendar" -- historical overview plus illustrative images from library's collection
 Art Gallery of Greater Victoria, British Columbia --link to period painting in museum collection
 Asia Society, New York -- link to porcelain figurines illustrating Kanbun era fashion...seated porcelain figurine
British Museum, London --link to further artist information

Japanese eras
1660s in Japan
1670s in Japan